Fryderyk is a given name, and may refer to:

 Fryderyk Chopin (1810–1849), a Polish piano composer
 Fryderyk Getkant (1600–1666), a military engineer, artilleryman and cartographer of German origin
 Fryderyk Scherfke (1909–1983), an interwar Polish soccer midfield player
 Michał Fryderyk Czartoryski (1696–1775), a Polish szlachcic

See also

 , a Polish sailing-ship launched in 1992 in the Dora Shipyard, Gdańsk, Poland
 Federico
 Fred
 Freddie
 Freddo
 Freddy
 Frédéric
 Frederick (given name)
 Frederico
 Fredrik
 Fredro
 Friedrich

Polish masculine given names